Andělská tvář (translates as Angelic Face) is a 2002 Czech adventure romance film directed by Zdeněk Troška. It is based on a novel by Marie Körnerová of the same name. The film was very expensive and producer Jiří Pomeje lend money from State Fund for the Support and Development of Czech Cinematography, but Pomeje was unable to pay his debt, since the film was commercial failure. Pomeje was then investigated for financial fraud.

Cast
 Michaela Kuklová as Charlotta Collierová
 Filip Blažek as Raoul De Mornay
 Jiří Pomeje as Filip De Mornay                                
 Dana Morávková as Margot Pinaudová
 Naďa Konvalinková as Richterová
 Miriam Kantorková as Midwife
 Jitka Ježková as Fauberg's sister
 Květa Fialová as Mother Superior
 Josef Vinklář as Judge Pinaud
 Marek Vašut as Lecierc
 Jan Přeučil as Parson
 Jiří Krampol as Ludvík

References

External links
 

2002 films
2000s Czech-language films
Czech adventure films
Czech romantic films
Films based on Czech novels
Films directed by Zdeněk Troška